Old Toongabbie is a suburb of Greater Western Sydney, in the state of New South Wales, Australia 29 kilometres west of the Sydney central business district in the local government area of the City of Parramatta.

History
Toongabbie is derived from an Aboriginal word, reported as meaning place by the water or meeting by the water. It was named in June 1792 after Governor Arthur Phillip asked the local Aboriginal people what they called the place. It is the oldest official use of an Aboriginal place-name – Parramatta which was founded earlier was first called Rose Hill.

The area continued to be known as Toongabbie until the construction of the Main Western railway line and the building of the railway station of Toongabbie. Over time the location of the station and the shops around it became known as Toongabbie and the original settlement was called Old Toongabbie to differentiate the two.

European settlement
Old Toongabbie is noted for being the third settlement set up after the First Fleet arrived in 1788 and established settlements in Australia. It was founded as a Government Farm to grow food for the colony in April 1792. After eleven years, the government farm was closed and the land was given as grants to settlers and convicts who had done their time.

In 1860, the railway was extended to Blacktown but it took 20 years before any arrangements were made for trains to stop at Toongabbie. The first school in Toongabbie, opened on 3 May 1886. By April 1911, the school closed due to low enrolments. The school reopened February the next year and has stayed open ever since.

The first post office in the area was opened after many years of campaigning by local residents in 1887 in a private house on Old Windsor Road and this arrangement continued until the 1960s. The first post master was a Mr Birks wand he was paid 25 pounds a year to manage the office and bring the mail bag over from Seven Hills on horseback each day. By 1922 the number of residents and businesses had grown sufficiently to support a second office in a weatherboard cottage in Wentworth Avenue, known as Toongabbie West. A purpose built office was opened in the main shopping area in Portico Parade in 1960 becoming Toongabbie Post Office whilst the old Toongabbie Post Office was renamed Old Toon

From the 1990s part of this area was unofficially known as the locality of Constitution Hill. The suburb of Constitution Hill was officially recognized in 2007.

Geography
The area is bounded on the north east by Toongabbie Creek, a tributary of the Parramatta River. Although Toongabbie is relatively densely settled, in recent years programs of bushland regeneration, pollution control and remedial works to local waterways have seen a surprising return by several rare wildlife species, and in the 1990s platypus were reported to have returned to sections of Toongabbie Creek.

Notable residents
 Former NSW Premier Nathan Rees was raised in Old Toongabbie and attended  Creative and Performing Arts High School.

References

External links
  [CC-By-SA]

Suburbs of Sydney
Populated places established in 1792
City of Parramatta